Boutros, Botros or Butrus; is the Arabic form of the name Peter, derived from Greek  (Petros). It is generally used as a male given name, but may also be used as a surname. 

Notable persons with the name Boutros or variants include:

Given name
Pope Peter V of Alexandria (reigned 1340 to 1348), Coptic Pope and Patriarch of the See of St. Mark
Pope Peter VI of Alexandria (reigned 1718 to 1726), Coptic Pope and Patriarch of the See of St. Mark
Pope Peter VII of Alexandria (reigned 1809 to 1852), Coptic Pope and Patriarch of the See of St. Mark
Ignatius Peter VII Jarweh (1777–1851), Patriarch of the Syrian Catholic Church
Butrus al-Bustani (1818–1883), Lebanese writer and scholar
Boutros Al-Hallaq (born 1966), Syrian politician
Boutros Ghali (1846–1910), Prime Minister of Egypt
Boutros Boutros-Ghali (1922–2016), Egyptian diplomat; Secretary General of the United Nations 1992-96
Nasrallah Boutros Sfeir (1920-2019), patriarch emeritus of the Maronite Catholic Church
Boutros Khawand (born 1940), Lebanese politician, kidnapped and now missing
Bechara Boutros al-Rahi (born 1940), Maronite Patriarch of Antioch
Boutros Harb (born 1944), Lebanese politician
Youssef Boutros Ghali (born 1952), Egyptian politician

Surname 

 Andrew S. Boutros, American law professor

Coptic given names
Arabic masculine given names